Clovis Le Bail (born 29 November 1995) is a French rugby union player, who plays for Section Paloise. His regular playing position is Scrum-half.

He was called by Fabien Galthié to the French national team for the first time in June 2021, for the Australia summer tour.

References

External link

1995 births
Living people
French rugby union players
Section Paloise players
Sportspeople from Nantes
Rugby union scrum-halves